Oliver Thompson (born 11 May 1900 in Wheatley Hill, County Durham, England, died 1975) was an English footballer.

During his career, he played for Spennymoor United, Merthyr Town, Chesterfield, Queens Park Rangers, York City and Halifax Town.

Career
Thompson joined Merthyr Town from Spennymoor United in 1921. After having made no league appearances for the club, he joined Chesterfield in 1922. After making a total of 218 league appearances for Chesterfield, he joined Queens Park Rangers in 1928, who he made a total of 18 league appearances for. Thompson joined York City in June 1929 from Queens Park Rangers and was the team's captain for their first three seasons in the Football League. After making a total of 133 appearances, he joined Halifax Town in 1932. He made 41 league appearances for the club, and re-joined Chesterfield in 1933, but made no league appearances for them. However, he stayed at the club as a trainer until 1966.

Notes

1900 births
English footballers
Association football midfielders
Spennymoor United F.C. players
Merthyr Town F.C. players
Chesterfield F.C. players
Queens Park Rangers F.C. players
York City F.C. players
Halifax Town A.F.C. players
1975 deaths
People from Wheatley Hill
Footballers from County Durham